Fritz Pauer (October 14, 1943 – July 1, 2012) was an Austrian jazz pianist, composer, and bandleader.

Career
Born in Vienna, Pauer began his professional playing career as a teenager, performing with Hans Koller (1960–62) before leading his own ensembles in Berlin. In the 1960s he played with  Don Byas, Booker Ervin, Art Farmer, Dexter Gordon, Friedrich Gulda, and Annie Ross. From 1968-1970 he taught at the Vienna Municipal Conservatory, and following this was a member of the ORF-Big Band. In the 1970s he recorded as a leader as well as with Klaus Weiss and Peter Herbolzheimer.

Pauer lived in Peru briefly in the mid-1980s, then moved to Switzerland in 1986. Later in life he became a university professor.

An early 2000s collaboration with Jay Clayton and Ed Neumeister was released as the album 3 for the Road.

Discography

As leader/co-leader
3 for the Road (Meisteromusic)

As sideman
With Art Farmer
Gentle Eyes (Mainstream, 1972)
The Company I Keep (Arabesque, 1994) with Tom Harrell as composer and arranger
The Meaning of Art (Arabesque, 1995) as composer and arranger

References

"Fritz Pauer". The New Grove Dictionary of Jazz, ed. Barry Kernfeld, 1994, p. 964.

1943 births
2012 deaths
Musicians from Vienna
Austrian jazz pianists
Austrian jazz composers
Male jazz composers
20th-century pianists
Male pianists
20th-century male musicians